James Gomer Berry, 1st Viscount Kemsley, GBE (7 May 1883 – 6 February 1968) was a Welsh colliery owner and newspaper publisher.

Background
Berry was born the son of John Mathias and Mary Ann (née Rowe) Berry, of Merthyr Tydfil in Wales. He was the younger brother of Henry Berry, 1st Baron Buckland, an industrialist, and William Berry, 1st Viscount Camrose, a fellow press lord.

Career
Berry originally co-owned The Daily Telegraph with his second brother Lord Camrose, and Lord Burnham. He founded Kemsley Newspapers, which owned The Sunday Times, The Daily Sketch and The Sunday Graphic amongst its titles.

Berry was chairman of the Reuters News Agency from 1951 to 1958.

In 1954, Berry was part of the Kemsley-Winnick consortium, which won the initial ITV weekend contracts for the Midlands and the North of England. Berry had cold feet over the financial risk, and withdrew, causing the consortium to collapse. In 1959, Kemsley Newspapers was bought by Lord Thomson, ironically enabled by Thomson's profits from Scottish Television.

Honours
Berry was created a baronet in 1928, and was appointed as an Officer of the Most Venerable Order of the Hospital of St John of Jerusalem in 1931. In 1936, he was raised to the peerage as Baron Kemsley, of Farnham Royal in the County of Buckingham, and advanced to Viscount Kemsley, of Dropmore in the County of Buckingham, in 1945. In 1929 he was appointed High Sheriff of Buckinghamshire and in 1959, a Knight Grand Cross of the Order of the British Empire (GBE) for "political and public service".

Marriages and family
Lord Kemsley married twice.  He married firstly in 1907 Mary Lilian Holmes, daughter of Horace George Holmes and Mary Johnston née Macgregor, with whom he had six sons and a daughter:

 (Geoffrey) Lionel Berry, 2nd Viscount Kemsley (born 29 June 1909, died 28 February 1999)
 Major Hon Denis Gomer Berry (born 11 July 1911, died 30 September 1983), father of Richard Berry, 3rd Viscount Kemsley. Denis married Rosemary Leonora Ruth de Rothschild for the first time.
 Hon William Neville Berry (born 16 June 1914, died 19 May 1998)
 Hon John Douglas Berry (born 1 May 1916, killed in action 10 October 1944)
 Hon Mary Pamela Berry (born 13 June 1918, died 29 January 1998)
 Flt Lt Hon Herbert Oswald Berry (born 13 June 1918, died 8 June 1952)
 Hon Sir Anthony George Berry (born 12 February 1925, killed 12 October 1984)

His first wife died on 1 February 1928 and on 30 April 1931 he married Marie Edith Dresselhuys (née Merandon du Plessis), daughter of E. N. Merandon du Plessis, heir of an old British colonial sugar estate in Mauritius, and mother of socialite Ghislaine Dresselhuys from her first marriage.  There were no children of this marriage.

Upon his death, Viscount Kemsley was buried in St Anne's churchyard, Dropmore.  Marie Edith, Viscountess Kemsley OBE was buried with him following her death on 12 September 1976.  The title passed to his eldest son Lionel. His youngest son, Conservative politician the Honourable Sir Anthony Berry, was killed by the IRA in the 1984 Brighton hotel bombing.

Works
As owner of Kemsley Newspapers, Viscount Kemsley made several written contributions to his in-house journal The Kemsley Writer.

Kemsley also oversaw the publication of the large format hardcover book The Kemsley Manual of Journalism (Cassell, 1950). Sub-titled A Comprehensive Guide to the Practice and Principles of Modern Journalism, this featured an introduction by Kemsley and an essay from his Foreign Manager Ian Fleming, later the author of the James Bond novels.

References

External links

1883 births
1968 deaths
Berry, Gomer
British newspaper publishers (people)
Knights Grand Cross of the Order of the British Empire
Peers created by Edward VIII
20th-century Welsh businesspeople
Welsh journalists
Officers of the Order of St John
High Sheriffs of Buckinghamshire
Gomer Berry
Viscounts created by George VI